Juan Pablo Ruiz Pérez (born 5 November 1982), known as Juan Pablo, is a Spanish former footballer who played as a centre forward.

Club career
Juan Pablo was born in La Puebla del Río, Province of Seville. During his early career, spent mainly in the lower leagues, he – an unsuccessful Real Betis youth graduate – represented Betis B, Racing Club Portuense, Hellín Deportivo, Dos Hermanas CF, Écija Balompié, Atlético Lucentino, CF Sporting Mahonés, Algeciras CF and Sevilla Atlético. With the latter, he made his Segunda División debut in the 2007–08 season, scoring four goals in 30 games as the Andalusians retained their status in their debut campaign in the competition.

In the summer of 2008, Juan Pablo joined FC Cartagena of Segunda División B. On 24 May 2009 he netted the deciding goal at CD Alcoyano (2–2, 4–3 aggregate win), as the Murcian side, under their new denomination, promoted to the second division for the first time ever.

After initially refusing to renew his link and wanting a buyout, which eventually led to his demotion to reserves Cartagena La Unión (only for training), Juan Pablo finally accepted, and was reinstated by Cartagena in January 2010. On the 29th, however, he was released, joining Valencia CF's reserves shortly after.

In August 2010, after his last team's relegation, Juan Pablo continued his career in the third tier, returning to former club Écija. He retired at the age of only 30 after becoming despondent with the sport, later working as manager and personal driver of bullfighter Morante de la Puebla.

References

External links

1982 births
Living people
People from Seville (comarca)
Sportspeople from the Province of Seville
Spanish footballers
Footballers from Andalusia
Association football forwards
Segunda División players
Segunda División B players
Tercera División players
Betis Deportivo Balompié footballers
Écija Balompié players
Lucena CF players
Algeciras CF footballers
Sevilla Atlético players
FC Cartagena footballers
Valencia CF Mestalla footballers